ETRM may refer to:
 Energy Trading and Risk Management (tool), a software to trade and analyze energy assets for trading of commodities e.g. on financial markets.
 Enterprise Technical Reference Model, an Open format